The Portugal women's national basketball team represents Portugal in international women's basketball competition. It is organized and run by the Portuguese Basketball Federation (FPB).

Championships participations

EuroBasket Women

FIBA Europe Under-20 Championship for Women

3x3 Team
Portugal's team won bronze at the 2018 Mediterranean Games in Tarragona and finished fourth place in the 2018 European Universities Games.

See also
Portugal women's national under-19 basketball team
Portugal women's national under-17 basketball team

References

External links
Archived records of Portugal team participations

 
Women's national basketball teams